The Bemaraha Formation is a Middle Jurassic (early Bajocian to early Bathonian) geological formation of the Morondava Basin of Madagascar. The lime mudstones, grainstones and limestones of the formation were deposited in lagoonal and reefal environments. Fossils of groups of invertebrates and theropod and sauropod tracks have been found in the formation. The Sahalaly River tracksite yielded a single trackway belonging to a quadrupedal dinosaur, possibly a sauropod. Sauropod tracks are rare, making up as little as 1 percent of the present sample. The best-preserved tracks are assigned to the ichnogenus Kayentapus.

Description 
The limestones of the Bemaraha Formation have been interpreted as a coastal barrier/lagoon complex of Middle Jurassic age (Bajocian, about 170 Ma). At that time, Madagascar had already separated from Africa, but was still attached to India and Antarctica. Since Antarctica was connected to southern Africa, a land bridge really  existed between Madagascar and all major southern hemisphere landmasses. Faunal exchanges were possible and endemism was probably very low. Madagascar was to become an island only some 80-90 million years later, during the Late Cretaceous. During Bajocian times, a narrow seaway stretched between eastern Africa and western Madagascar, much in the same position as today's Mozambique Channel. Along the shores of western Madagascar, coral reefs separated wide lagoons from the open  sea. The remnants of this reef/lagoon complex is what today, after the coastline shifted several tens of kilometers westward, is seen in the limestones of the Bemaraha Formation.

The outcropping  limestones can roughly be divided into a western and an eastern belt with different facies.

In the western belt, the formation mainly consists of massive limestones with  metre-scale bedding or no recognizable bedding at all. Oolites and fossils of reefal  organisms (mainly corals) are common in places. This region is affected by the spectacular karst features known as "tsingy" and for this reason most of the area is part of the Tsingy de Bemaraha National Park, included in the UNESCO World Heritage Sites list. The facies in the eastern belt is made up mainly of  fine-grained and well-bedded limestones with the average thickness of the individual beds being a few tens of centimeters. Beds are often laminated and invertebrate fossils  (gastropods, bivalves, brachiopods, echinoids and isolated coral fragments) are common in some beds, while others are devoid of fossils.

In the south-western Majunga Basin, interbedded limestones and mudstones (shales and marls) above the Aalenian Sandstone were attributed to a Bajocian carbonate platform formed by the Bemaraha Formation. The carbonate platform at the Manambolo and Tsiribihina River gorges, which cut through the Bemaraha plateau, are likewise assigned to the Early Bajocian. At the eastern margin of the Bemaraha Plateau, the carbonate succession directly rests on Isalo sandstones. Farther south at Besabora (along National Road RN35), limestones with the foraminifera Mesoendothyra croatica and Protopeneroplis striata support a Middle Jurassic (Bajocian to Early Bathonian) age.

See also 
 List of stratigraphic units with dinosaur tracks
 List of stratigraphic units with theropod tracks
 List of stratigraphic units with sauropodomorph tracks
 List of fossiliferous stratigraphic units in Madagascar
 Geology of Madagascar
 Isalo III Formation
 Kandreho Formation
 Etjo Sandstone

References

Bibliography 
 
 
 
 
 

Geologic formations of Madagascar
Jurassic System of Africa
Middle Jurassic Africa
Jurassic Madagascar
Bajocian Stage
Bathonian Stage
Mudstone formations
Limestone formations
Lagoonal deposits
Reef deposits
Ichnofossiliferous formations
Paleontology in Madagascar
Formations